In Greek mythology, the name Dolops (Ancient Greek: Δόλοψ) may refer to:

Dolops, a son of Cronus and the Oceanid Philyra, brother of Chiron.
Dolops, son of Hermes, who died in the city of Magnessa. His tomb was located at the seashore; the Argonauts stopped by it for two days, waiting for the stormy weather to be over, and offered sacrifices to him.
Dolops the Achaean, son of Clytius, killed by Hector in the Trojan War.
Dolops the Trojan, son of Lampus. In the Iliad, he confronted Meges in a battle and could have killed him if not for Meges' strong corselet; as Meges fought back, Menelaus attacked Dolops from behind and killed him, whereupon the Greeks removed his armor.
Dolops of Lemnos, father of the shepherd Iphimachus who took care of the abandoned Philoctetes.

Other uses
 Dolops (crustacean) - a genus of fish lice in the family Argulidae

Notes

References 

 Apollonius Rhodius, Argonautica translated by Robert Cooper Seaton (1853-1915), R. C. Loeb Classical Library Volume 001. London, William Heinemann Ltd, 1912. Online version at the Topos Text Project.
 Apollonius Rhodius, Argonautica. George W. Mooney. London. Longmans, Green. 1912. Greek text available at the Perseus Digital Library.
 Gaius Julius Hyginus, Fabulae from The Myths of Hyginus translated and edited by Mary Grant. University of Kansas Publications in Humanistic Studies. Online version at the Topos Text Project.
 Homer, The Iliad with an English Translation by A.T. Murray, Ph.D. in two volumes. Cambridge, MA., Harvard University Press; London, William Heinemann, Ltd. 1924. . Online version at the Perseus Digital Library.
 Homer, Homeri Opera in five volumes. Oxford, Oxford University Press. 1920. . Greek text available at the Perseus Digital Library.
 The Orphic Argonautica, translated by Jason Colavito. © Copyright 2011. Online version at the Topos Text Project.

Children of Hermes
Achaeans (Homer)
Trojans
Children of Cronus